Diego López Rodríguez (born 3 November 1981) is a Spanish professional footballer who plays as a goalkeeper for La Liga club Rayo Vallecano.

After spending seven years with Real Madrid, playing for its various teams, he made a name for himself in La Liga with Villarreal, appearing in 230 official games over the course of five seasons. In 2013, following a brief spell with Sevilla, he returned to Real Madrid.

López represented Spain at the 2009 Confederations Cup.

Club career

Real Madrid
López was born in Paradela, Lugo, Galicia. A youth graduate from hometown's CD Lugo he signed with Real Madrid at age 18 and, after a loan at another side from the capital region, AD Alcorcón, he eventually moved up to Real's B team, starting in his second season, which ended in promotion to the Segunda División.

López served as first-team backup to Iker Casillas in the following two La Liga campaigns: in the closing stages of 2005–06 he appeared in back-to-back away wins, against CA Osasuna (as Casillas was sent off) and Racing de Santander, adding a UEFA Champions League group stage game at Olympiakos FC, a 2–1 defeat.

Villarreal

In late June 2007, López signed for Villarreal CF for a reported fee of €6 million, and started the season as second choice to Uruguayan Sebastián Viera but, after a string of fine performances – he played in the Copa del Rey and the UEFA Cup – he was picked for the first team, finishing the season with 21 matches.

López was ever-present in 2008–09, playing every minute and helping Villarreal finish fifth in the league. The following campaign was similar, but the team could only finish seventh, out of the European places. However, as fifth-placed RCD Mallorca were expelled from European competition due to bankruptcy, the Valencians took their place in the qualifying rounds of the UEFA Europa League.

López featured in every league game except one in 2011–12, being given his marching orders against Sevilla FC in a 2–2 home draw in the second round. The Yellow Submarine were eventually relegated after twelve years, with the player conceding 50 goals. His 121 consecutive top-flight games set a 21st-century record in the league, which was broken by Iñaki Williams in 2019.

Sevilla
On 22 May 2012, López joined Sevilla on a five-year contract for a reported fee of €3.5 million. He split first-choice status with Andrés Palop during his spell.

Return to Real Madrid

On 25 January 2013, López returned to Real Madrid after Casillas suffered a hand injury which ruled him out for 12 weeks, signing for €3.5 million until June 2017. Shortly upon arriving, he stated he had always dreamed of coming back to the club.

López played his first game in his second spell on 30 January 2013, in a 1–1 home draw against FC Barcelona in the Spanish Cup semi-finals. On 5 March, he made a string of saves as Real beat Manchester United 2–1 at Old Trafford to qualify for the last-eight in the Champions League (3–2 on aggregate); after the match, coach José Mourinho said: "Diego López was the best player in my team". He retained his position until the end of the season, even though Casillas had already returned to full fitness.

López retained his number one position at the start of the following campaign, when Carlo Ancelotti had replaced Mourinho. Casillas was played in both the Champions League and the domestic cup, however.

Milan
On 13 August 2014, Real Madrid and A.C. Milan reached an agreement over the transfer of López. He made his competitive debut on 31 August in the first match of the new season in Serie A, saving a late penalty from Antonio Candreva in a 3–1 win over S.S. Lazio. On 14 September he suffered a right thigh injury against Parma FC, being sidelined for almost a month.

After three matches without a win early into the 2015–16 campaign, manager Siniša Mihajlović dropped López in favour of 16-year-old Gianluigi Donnarumma.

Espanyol
On 31 August 2016, López joined RCD Espanyol on a season-long loan deal. He was elected La Liga Player of the Month in November, after not conceding in any of the three matches.

López's move was made permanent on 23 May 2017, on a three-year deal with a buyout clause of €50 million. He was overtaken by Pau López still under manager Quique Sánchez Flores, but after the latter moved to Real Betis, he regained his starting role and was the only player to feature in all 38 games of 2018–19.

In August 2020, after Espanyol's relegation, the nearly 39-year-old López signed for another season. In that year, he recorded the best figures for his position with 25 goals conceded in 40 matches, as the Pericos won the title.

Rayo Vallecano
López signed a one-year contract with Rayo Vallecano on 2 July 2022, as a free agent.

International career

Spain
As third goalkeeper, López was first selected for Spain for two 2010 FIFA World Cup qualifiers in late March/early April 2009, both against Turkey. He was named in the squad by manager Vicente del Bosque for the 2009 FIFA Confederations Cup in South Africa behind Casillas and Pepe Reina, and did not play any matches there.

López earned his only cap on 12 August 2009, playing the last 30 minutes of a 3–2 friendly win in Macedonia, replacing Reina and not conceding any goals.

Galicia
López made three appearances for the unofficial Galicia team, starting with their first game for 75 years on 29 December 2005. They won 3–2 against Uruguay in Santiago de Compostela.

Style of play
López was a commanding and well-rounded goalkeeper, with a large and imposing physique, strong leadership qualities and good handling, which facilitated him in coming out to claim crosses. Possessing quick reactions, concentration and a good positional sense, he was also an effective shot-stopper.

López was known in particular for his ball control, distribution and speed when rushing off his line to anticipate opponents.

Personal life
López married Iria Otero on 11 June 2011, fathering three children.

Career statistics

Club

Honours
Real Madrid
Copa del Rey: 2013–14; runner-up 2012–13
UEFA Champions League: 2013–14

Espanyol
Segunda División: 2020–21

Spain
FIFA Confederations Cup third place: 2009

Individual
La Liga Player of the Month: November 2016

References

External links

1981 births
Living people
People from Sarria (comarca)
Sportspeople from the Province of Lugo
Spanish footballers
Footballers from Galicia (Spain)
Association football goalkeepers
La Liga players
Segunda División players
Segunda División B players
Tercera División players
CD Lugo players
Real Madrid C footballers
Real Madrid Castilla footballers
Real Madrid CF players
AD Alcorcón footballers
Villarreal CF players
Sevilla FC players
RCD Espanyol footballers
Rayo Vallecano players
Serie A players
A.C. Milan players
UEFA Champions League winning players
Spain international footballers
2009 FIFA Confederations Cup players
Spanish expatriate footballers
Expatriate footballers in Italy
Spanish expatriate sportspeople in Italy